Leonardo Rodríguez Solís is an Argentine film cinematographer. He has also been credited as: Leonardo Solis, Leonard Solis, and Leandro Rodríguez Solís.

Some of his films have been critically well received: Funny Dirty Little War (1983) and Night of the Pencils (1986).

Filmography (partial)
Brigada en acción (1977)
 My Family's Beautiful! (1980)
 Deathstalker (1983) 
 No habrá más penas ni olvido (1983) aka Funny Dirty Little War 
 The Warrior and the Sorceress (1984) 
 Vengeance of a Soldier (1984) aka Soldier's Revenge 
 Wizards of the Lost Kingdom (1985) 
 Las Barras bravas (1985) 
 Mingo y Aníbal contra los fantasmas (1985)
 La Noche de los lápices (1986) aka Night of the Pencils
 Las Aventuras de Tremendo (1986)
 Amazons (1986)
 El Año del conejo (1987)
 Deathstalker II (1987) aka Deathstalker II: Duel of the Titans 
 Stormquest (1987) 
 Jailbird Rock (1988) aka Prison Dancer 
 Two to Tango (1988) aka Matar es morir un poco

Television (partial)
 Dagli Appennini alle Ande (1990) (Mini TV Series) aka De los Apeninos a los Andes

References

External links
 
 

Argentine cinematographers
Living people
Place of birth missing (living people)
Year of birth missing (living people)